Continuum is a collaborative ambient and drone music project between Bass Communion (Steven Wilson of Porcupine Tree) and Dirk Serries (of Vidna Obmana and Fear Falls Burning). The project looks to expand on the artists' "collective ambition and vision, motivated by their immense passion for a wide-range of musical styles, ranging from spacious ambience to pounding doom metal."

Discography

The first volume in the collaboration between Bass Communion and Vidna Obmana was originally limited to 25 promotional copies. However, the promotional copies sold quickly, leading to the pressing of a 1,000 copy official release. The album is packaged in a book sized digipack designed by Lasse Hoile. The difference between promotional copies and the official release is a small black line through the bar code.

A second edition of 1,000 copies was released in July 2008.

The Continuum Recyclings, Volume One is a double LP companion release to the first Continuum album. The album consists of four side-long tracks based on Bass Communion's unreleased "Construct III – Immersion Mix". Each track was expanded upon by Vidna Obmana using Continuum I as source material.

The album was released on 180 grams marbled vinyl in gatefold picture sleeve and limited to 500 copies.

Part two of a collaboration series between Bass Communion and Vidna Obmana was Limited to 2,000 copies in book sized digipack designed by Lasse Hoile.

The Continuum Recyclings, Volume Two is a double LP companion release to the second Continuum album consisting of a complete album reconstruction by Justin Broadrick of Jesu and Godflesh.

The album was released on 180 grams marbled vinyl in gatefold picture sleeve and limited to 500 copies.

External links
 Continuum Official MySpace
 [ Review of Continuum I] at Allmusic

References 

Soleilmoon artists
English progressive rock groups